Georg Christian Karl Wilhelm Michahelles (5 May 1807, Nuremberg – 15 August 1834, Nauplia) was a German zoologist and physician originally from Bavaria.

From 1827, he studied medicine at the University of Munich, where he made the acquaintance of naturalist Lorenz Oken. In 1831 he received his doctorate of medicine and surgery with the thesis Das Malo Di Scarlievo in Historischer Und Pathologischer Hinsicht.

Michahelles travelled extensively in Dalmatia, Illyria and Croatia, becoming well known for his study of the birds of the area. He died after being affected with dysentery in Greece, aged only 27, where he went to practice medicine and study the wildlife.

He identified, amongst other Mediterranean species, the western rock nuthatch, ladder snake and the  Iberian ribbed newt. The yellow-legged gull (Larus michahellis) was named after him by Johann Friedrich Naumann.

Publications 
 Ueber einige dalmatinische Vertebraten. in: Isis, 1830. p. 809—820.
 Neue südeuropäische Amphibien. In: Isis von Oken, XXIII, Leipzig 1830, S. 189–195, S. 806–809.

References 

1807 births
1834 deaths
German ornithologists
Scientists from Nuremberg
Ludwig Maximilian University of Munich alumni